Domenico Libri (May 24, 1934 – May 1, 2006), also known as Don Mico, was an Italian criminal and a member of the 'Ndrangheta in Calabria. Libri was a fugitive since June 1989 and included in the list of most wanted fugitives in Italy until his capture in September 1992. At the time he was considered to be the 'Ndrangheta’s number one.

'Ndrangheta heritage
The Libri clan, headed by Domenico and his brother Pasquale, dominated the Cannavò neighbourhood of Reggio Calabria. They moved into construction and were able to win public contracts for their company Edilizia Reggina due to their contacts with politicians, such as Riccardo Misasi, a former Christian Democrat Education Minister.

Libri's first arrest was in 1962, for illegal possession of firearms. In the following years multiple arrests and short prison sentences followed on charges for fraud, extortion, instigation to murder, murder, drug trafficking and criminal association.

Second 'Ndrangheta war

Libri was closely connected to the De Stefano clan and sided with them when the so-called second 'Ndrangheta war broke out in 1985. After the murder of Paolo De Stefano on October 13, 1985, Libri succeeded him as the leader of the alliance with Giovanni Tegano. The bloody six-year war (1985–1991) between the Condello-Imerti clan and De Stefano-Tegano-Libri-Latella clan left 621 deaths.

In the midst of the 'Ndrangheta war he was arrested on October 13, 1986, in Milan (he had been banned by the court to reside in Calabria). Libri became one of the principal targets of the opposing clans. While in prison a sniper killed his son Pasquale Rocco Libri on September 10, 1988, as he was strolling in the prison yard. Six months later, on March 17, 1989, a sniper just missed Don Mico Libri, surrounded by Carabinieri, when he was leaving the court in Reggio Calabria where he had to appear in a trial against the 'Ndrangheta.

Fugitive
He obtained a medical release for arteriopathy, which forced him to walk with a crutch. After being released from the hospital on June 2, 1989, Libri managed to escape his escort of eight Carabinieri and went on the run. While on the run he returned to his strongly protected villa in Reggio Calabria to continue the war against rival clans. 

A peace for the bloody feud was brokered in September 1991 on the instigation of Domenico Libri. The conflict was settled with the help of other 'Ndrangheta bosses. Antonio Nirta, head of the San Luca locale vouched for the De Stefano-Tegano and Libri, while Antonio Mammoliti vouched for the Condello-Imerti clan. Libri became a member of Camera di Controllo, a provincial commission of the 'Ndrangheta formed at the end of the Second 'Ndrangheta war in September 1991, to avoid further internal conflicts.

Arrested in France
On September 17, 1992, he was arrested in Marseille (France). He was extradited to Italy. While on trial for murders and criminal association and his role in the Second 'Ndrangheta war, he was released for medical reason and placed under house arrest. According to prosecutor Salvatore Boemi the release was "a slap in the face for those who have worked for the restoration of justice in Calabria." His son Antonio Libri, also on the list of most wanted fugitives in Italy, was arrested on May 23, 2000. 

In April 2002, he received six life sentences for 18 murders and criminal association in the Olimpia Trial against the 'Ndrangheta. In and out of prison for medical reasons, he was arrested again in March 2006 in Prato where he was living under house arrest. Libri died on May 1, 2006, in the Secondigliano prison in Naples.

References

1934 births
2006 deaths
Fugitives
Fugitives wanted by Italy
Italian people convicted of murder
Italian people who died in prison custody
Italian prisoners sentenced to life imprisonment
'Ndranghetisti
'Ndranghetisti sentenced to life imprisonment
People convicted of murder by Italy
People extradited from France
People extradited to Italy
People from Reggio Calabria
Prisoners sentenced to life imprisonment by Italy
Prisoners who died in Italian detention